Events from the year 1665 in France.

Incumbents 
Monarch: Louis XIV

Events
 January 5 – The Journal des sçavans begins publication, the world's first scientific journal.
 October 21 – Manufacture royale de glaces de miroirs (Royal Mirror-Glass Factory, a predecessor of Saint-Gobain), is established by royal letters patent issued by Jean-Baptiste Colbert in Paris.
 Colonisation of Réunion begins with the French East India Company sending twenty settlers.

Arts and literature
 February 15 – Molière's comedy Dom Juan is first presented, at the Théâtre du Palais-Royal (rue Saint-Honoré) in Paris, in its original prose version with the playwright playing Sganarelle; it is withdrawn after 15 performances following attacks on its morality.
 April–November – Italian sculptor Gian Lorenzo Bernini is fêted in Paris.
 April 17 – Roger de Rabutin, Comte de Bussy (elected this year to the Académie française), begins a year's imprisonment in the Bastille for besmirching the reputation of the ladies of the French Court in Histoire amoureuse des Gaules.
 September 22 – Molière's L'Amour médecin is first presented, before Louis XIV of France at the Palace of Versailles with music by Jean-Baptiste Lully.
 December 4 – Jean Racine's tragedy Alexandre le Grand is premièred by Molière's troupe at the Théâtre du Palais-Royal (rue Saint-Honoré) in Paris. 11 days later, Racine moves it to the Comédiens du Roi at the Hôtel de Bourgogne, causing a rift with Molière.
 Guillaume-Gabriel Nivers publishes Livre d'orgue contenant cent pièces de tous les tons de l'église, the first organ collection that featured forms that became standard for the Baroque French organ school.
 Claude Perrault begins work on the eastern wing of the Louvre.

Births
 March 12 – Jean-François Foucquet, Jesuit prelate, missionary and scientist (d. 1741)
 March 17 – Élisabeth Jacquet de La Guerre, harpsichordist and composer (d. 1729)
 April 19 – Jacques Lelong, bibliographer (d. 1721).

Deaths
 January 11 – Louise de La Fayette, courtier, friend of King Louis XIII (b. 1618)
 January 12 – Pierre de Fermat, mathematician (b. 1601)
 January 29 – Jeanne des Anges, Ursuline nun in Loudun (b. 1602)
 April 21 – Jean-Joseph Surin, Jesuit writer (b. 1600)
 July 28 – Louis Giry, lawyer and classical scholar (b. 1596)
 October 22 – César, Duke of Vendôme, nobleman (b. 1594)
 November 19 – Nicolas Poussin, painter (b. 1594)
 November 24 – Simon Le Moyne, missionary (b. 1604)
 December 2 – Catherine de Vivonne, marquise de Rambouillet, socialite (b. 1588)

See also

References

1660s in France